Charles Albert Cannon (November 29, 1892 – April 2, 1971) was the son of Cannon Mills Company founder James William Cannon and president of the firm from the 1920s to the 1960s. He was born, lived and died in Concord, North Carolina.

With Cannon Mills

Cannon Mills manufacturing plants were located mainly in and around Concord, North Carolina and particularly in nearby Kannapolis, North Carolina, a company-owned town created and named after the Cannon family. Kannapolis was the largest unincorporated town in the nation for many years. Due to the support of the Cannon family the YMCA in Kannapolis enjoyed one of the highest memberships in the nation and had excellent facilities. Cannon Mills headquarters was in Concord, and the family mansion in downtown Concord is now part of the First Presbyterian Church complex.

There were multiple plants employing thousands of people during this time, running three shifts and producing sheets and towels.

Cannon was a great industrialist and involved in philanthropy in the community which included churches, schools, hospitals and libraries.

Many of the families that worked in the mill lived in company houses generally of clapboard with 2-3 bedrooms and one bath and rented to the employees by the company at very cheap rates.

The downtown of Kannapolis was constructed in the Colonial style, mostly brick and very elegant and directly because of the Cannon family.

While there were no unions in any of the operations, work was generally good during this era, and many people from other communities flocked to Kannapolis during the Great Depression because of jobs.  The mill was the prominent employer in the area and there were no other significant manufacturing operations during that time.

His grandson, Robin Hayes, was a Republican congressman from North Carolina.

External links
 Charles Albert Cannon at the North Carolina Business History website

1892 births
1971 deaths
American textile industry businesspeople
Businesspeople from North Carolina
People from Concord, North Carolina
20th-century American businesspeople